UWN Primetime Live is a weekly professional wrestling Pay-per-view (PPV) produced by United Wrestling Network (UWN).

History 
On August 10, 2020, United Wrestling Network (UWN) released a statement that they will partner with National Wrestling Alliance (NWA) to produce UWN Primetime Live, which will be aired on a weekly basis from Long Beach, California, at the Thunder Studios. On September 15, UWN Primetime Live produced their first event, where the NWA World Heavyweight Champion Nick Aldis successfully defended the title against Mike Bennett in the main event.

On the September 29 edition of UWN Primetime Live, Trevor Murdoch defeated the NWA National Heavyweight Champion Aron Stevens to win the title, marking the first title change at UWN Primetime Live. NWA is currently airing the Primetime Live tapings as a weekly web television program under the Shockwave banner since December 2, 2020, on NWA's YouTube channel, replacing the time slot of NWA Power.

List of pay-per-views

References

External links

2020 American television series debuts
National Wrestling Alliance shows
United Wrestling Network
American professional wrestling television series
English-language television shows